Ağaçpınar can refer to the following villages in Turkey:

 Ağaçpınar, Bitlis
 Ağaçpınar, Ceyhan